Clifton is a New Jersey Transit train station located in Clifton, New Jersey that provides service via the Main Line. The station is located near the intersection of Elm Street, Clifton Terrace, and Clifton Boulevard in Clifton and the tracks form the border between the Athenia and Dutch Hill sections of the city, with the Hoboken-bound platform in the Athenia section and the Suffern-bound platform located in the Dutch Hill section.

History
The Boonton Branch of the Delaware, Lackawanna and Western Railroad was first constructed as a freight bypass of the Morris & Essex Railroad in 1868. This was constructed due to the unsuitability of its passenger lines for freight (due to curves and inclines) and stretched from the Denville station to Hoboken Terminal via Boonton and Paterson. Freight service began on September 12, 1870, while passenger service began on December 14, 1870.

Station layout

The station has two tracks, each with a low-level side platform. Parking for up to 236 cars is available with two lots and some limited street parking along Fornelius Avenue. The station house is open during the day for riders to wait for their trains, and there are also benches and shelters on both platforms. Ticket vending machines are located adjacent to the Hoboken-bound platform.

Bibliography

References

External links

 Clifton Boulevard entrance from Google Maps Street View

NJ Transit Rail Operations stations
Railway stations in Passaic County, New Jersey
Clifton, New Jersey
Former Delaware, Lackawanna and Western Railroad stations
1870 establishments in New Jersey
Railway stations in the United States opened in 1870